The 1987 Virginia Slims of Dallas was a women's tennis tournament played on indoor carpet courts at the Moody Coliseum in Dallas, Texas in the United States and was part of the Category 4 tier of the 1987 WTA Tour. It was the 17th edition of the tournament and ran from March 16 through March 22, 1987. First-seeded Chris Evert-Lloyd won the singles title.

Finals

Singles
 Chris Evert-Lloyd defeated  Pam Shriver 6–1, 6–3
 It was Evert-Lloyd's 1st singles title of the year and the 149th of her career.

Doubles
 Mary-Lou Piatek /  Anne White defeated  Elise Burgin /  Robin White 7–5, 6–3

References

External links
 ITF tournament edition details
 Tournament draws

Virginia Slims of Dallas
Virginia Slims of Dallas
Virginia
Virginia
Virginia Slims of Dallas
Virginia Slims of Dallas